The 1984–85 season of the Moroccan Throne Cup was the 29th edition of the competition.

FAR de Rabat won the competition, beating Difaâ Hassani El Jadidi 3–0 in the final, played at the Prince Moulay Abdellah Stadium in Rabat. FAR de Rabat won the cup for the fourth time in their history.

Tournament

Last 16

Quarter-finals

Semi-finals

Final 
The final took place between the winners of the two semi-finals, FAR de Rabat and Difaâ Hassani El Jadidi, on 16 January 1986 at the Prince Moulay Abdellah Stadium in Rabat.

Notes and references 

1984
1984 in association football
1985 in association football
1984–85 in Moroccan football